The fourth season of the reality television series Black Ink Crew aired on VH1 from April 4, 2016 until June 27, 2016. It chronicles the daily operations and staff drama at an African American–owned and operated tattoo shop in Harlem, New York.

Cast

Main
Ceaser Emanuel
Dutchess Lattimore
O'Shit Duncan
Puma Robinson
Sky Day
Donna Lombardi
Ted Ruks

Recurring
Walt Miller
Quani Robinson
Kathie Arseno
Sassy Bermudez
Melody Mitchell
Naeem Sharif
Young Phoenix

Episodes

References

2016 American television seasons
Black Ink Crew